Brighton and Sussex University Hospitals NHS Trust, abbreviated as BSUH, was an NHS foundation trust ran two acute hospitals, the Royal Sussex County Hospital in Brighton and the Princess Royal Hospital in Haywards Heath. It also operated a number of other hospitals and medical facilities, including the Royal Alexandra Children's and Sussex Eye Hospitals in Brighton, Hove Polyclinic, the Park Centre for Breast Care at Preston Park and Hurstwood Park Neurosciences Centre in Haywards Heath. The Trust also provided services in Brighton General Hospital, Lewes Victoria Hospital, Bexhill Renal Satellite Unit, Eastbourne District General Hospital and Worthing Hospital.

In July 2020 it announced plans to merge with Western Sussex Hospitals NHS Foundation Trust.

On April 1, 2021, it officially merged to become University Hospitals Sussex NHS Foundation Trust

History 
The trust was established on 1 April 2002. and disbanded on March 31, 2021,

In June 2012 the trust was fined £325,000 by the Information Commissioner's Office after highly sensitive files of tens of thousands of patients, including details of HIV treatment, ended up being sold on eBay. In February 2014, the Trust announced it was updating its policy to include e-cigarettes in a blanket ban on smoking in its buildings and grounds. It established a joint venture, Frontier Pathology NHS Partnership, with Surrey and Sussex Healthcare NHS Trust in 2015.

Development programme
The Trust is undergoing a £484.7 million public capital development programme for the modernisation of the Royal Sussex County Hospital, which has the oldest buildings in the NHS still used for acute care. Treasury funding for the redevelopment was approved in May 2014. Laing O'Rourke started work on the project in September 2014 by constructing temporary buildings.  The first phase is due for completion in 2020, with the overall programme due to be completed by 2024.

After securing agreement from NHS Improvement, the Trust got planning permission in September 2017 for a £30 million redevelopment of the Royal Sussex County Hospital's A&E department, including a new 70 bed short-stay ward. A new Emergency Ambulatory Care Unit (EACU) opened in March 2018, where medical and surgical teams work alongside each other to treat emergency patients who do not need to stay in overnight.

Performance

In January 2019, the Care Quality Commission (CQC) rated the Trust as "good" overall and scored it as "outstanding" for caring.

The CQC found, after inspections in 2018, that "The trust had made huge improvements since the new executive team had introduced improved systems of working. The trust had a new strategy, vision and values which underpinned a culture which was patient centred. The ‘Patient First Improvement System’ had empowered front line staff by equipping them with the lean tools, methods and a structured process which had helped to build and promote a culture of continuous improvement across the whole trust." The CQC also found that the Trust's leaders "promoted a positive culture that supported and valued staff...There was a significant change in the culture since the last inspection. Bullying and acceptance of poor behaviour was no longer recognised by staff."

This turnaround follows several difficult years at the Trust.

A Care Quality Commission report in 2014 said that accident and emergency services at Royal Sussex County Hospital were inadequate for responsiveness, suffered significant pressures and lacked sufficient physical space to deal with the number of patients that attended. The trust was one of 26 responsible for half of the national growth in patients waiting more than four hours in accident and emergency over the 2014/5 winter.  The trust spent £14.7 million on agency staff in 2014/5.

In March 2015 it was announced that the trust's 5-year contract with Sodexo for cleaning, catering and portering services which started in December 2012 would be terminated early in July 2015 by mutual consent after problems with staff pay and safety concerns over equipment and cleanliness standards. It ended 2015/6 in deficit of £45 million.

In June 2016 it reported a backlog of more than 9000 patients who had waited more than 18 weeks for treatment in breach of the target, and only 73% of current referrals were seen within the target. It did not expect to hit the target before March 2018.
Following an inspection in April 2016, the Trust was given a formal warning by the Care Quality Commission in June 2016. It was told to improve its risk management as patients were being put at unnecessary risk because they were not being dealt with properly or in appropriate areas, to ensure the care privacy and dignity of people attending hospital and to ensure patients are seen in line with national timescales for diagnosis and treatment.  It was put into special measures in October 2016. It had its accreditation suspended by the United Kingdom Accreditation Service in 2016 when staff shortages affected turn round times.

NHS Improvement removed the existing management and contracted the executive from Western Sussex NHS Foundation Trust to provide leadership to the Trust for three years from April 2017. The Care Quality Commission inspected the Trust's two main hospitals in April 2017, whose ratings improved from Inadequate to Requires Improvement. The CQC said that they had found “significant improvements” across the Trust, but recommended it stays in special measures. The CQC concluded that “There is no doubt that improvements have been made since our last inspection and that the staff involved in the delivery of that change should be congratulated. However, there remains an extensive programme of change to be delivered in order to attain an overall rating of good. The lack of consistent board and executive leadership has hampered the pace of change in the last twelve months and it is anticipated that the incoming management team can provide both stability and clarity of leadership that will lead to sustainable change."

In 2019 It was taken out of special measures but there were still concerns about performance against NHS targets.  160 12-hour trolley waits were reported from the A&E department in January and February. 25% of patients waited six weeks or more for diagnostic tests in January.  Only  77% against the 95% target of patients were seen within 18 weeks of referral and only 65.7% of cancer patients started treatment within the six week target.  The trust is planning for a deficit of £53 million on the year.  It reported a 30% drop in hip and knee surgery patients in 2018–9, with twice the number of patients in the area choosing private providers for NHS-funded hip and knee operations.

Diversity and Discrimination
After a history of claims of discrimination at the Trust, the  CQC found in its January 2019 report that "Staff felt equality and diversity were promoted in their day today work. We spoke with the newly formed Black and minority ethnicity working group...[who] told us that they had seen a dramatic change...Staff told us that although they had not always felt supported in the past since the new executive team had arrived they now felt confident that they could raise any concerns about staff behaviours towards them with their line managers, and they felt assured that their concerns would be listened to and acted on appropriately."

This is a significant change since the Care Quality Commission had found in August 2014 that there had been a “significant increase” in disciplinary cases related to race discrimination. The Black and Minority Ethnic Network in the Trust passed a vote of no confidence in the trust board in November 2015. A petition was circulated claiming that “BME people are being subjected to unprecedented levels of racial discrimination, harassment and victimisation.”

See also
 Healthcare in Sussex
 List of hospitals in England
 List of NHS trusts

References

External links 
 
 Brighton and Sussex University Hospitals NHS Trust on the NHS website
 Inspection reports from the Care Quality Commission

Defunct NHS trusts
Health in Sussex